Matthew Powell (born 27 September 1973) is a former Australian rules footballer who played with Adelaide in the Australian Football League (AFL).

Powell was recruited from South Adelaide, with the 56th selection of the 1992 AFL draft and played two league games in 1993. Over the next two season he made 14 appearances, seven each year, but didn't do enough to stay on Adelaide's list.

He kept playing SANFL football until retiring at the end of the 2004 season. In 2002 he was a member of the Sturt which ended their 26-year premiership drought. Playing as a defender, he was awarded the Jack Oatey Medal for his grand final performance.

His son Tom Powell also played for Sturt and was drafted by North Melbourne in the 2020 AFL draft.

References

1973 births
Australian rules footballers from South Australia
Adelaide Football Club players
South Adelaide Football Club players
Sturt Football Club players
Living people